Ljiljana Krstić (31 October 1919 – 12 April 2001) was a Serbian actress who mostly worked in theater.

Krstić initially studied law, before transferring to the Theatre Department of the Musical Academy in Belgrade. After graduation, she worked at National Theatre, Yugoslav Drama Theatre, Belgrade Drama Theatre and Atelje 212 Theatre. In 1995 she received the Dobričin prsten, which is considered the most distinguished award in the Serbian theater.

Selected filmography

References

External links 

1919 births
2001 deaths
Actors from Kragujevac
Serbian film actresses
Laureates of the Ring of Dobrica
Yugoslav actresses